The Northwoods are the boreal forest of North America, covering about half of Canada and parts of Minnesota, Wisconsin, Michigan, New York, Vermont, New Hampshire and Maine.

For the part within the borders of the Midwestern United States, see North Woods.

The Boreal forest and its alpine cousins are host to a wide variety of deer, ranging from the large moose to the whitetail deer.  All of these large herbivores prefer the cool forest lest they overheat in the sun, but all need open land on which to graze.  Of the deer, moose are perhaps best adapted to wetlands and thrive in the boggy boreal forest.

The temperate conifer forests of the United States contain more than forty important cone-bearing forest tree species. These forests all have members of the taxonomic family called Pinaceae and most are commercially sought. However, some have uses outside the traditional forest product market. This massive softwood forest is spread over the entire North American continent and makes up the major portion of both trees and volume.
There are five principal forest regions in North America that comprise the coniferous forest. The forests are equally spread geographically between east and west. Because of the forest's great size, and because of differing climate and soils, North America is favored by a rich variety of these "evergreens". This forest supports four times as many tree species as Europe does.

The Pacific Coniferous Forest Region in United States

This forest region runs along a thin strip of land for three thousand miles, from Kodiak Island in Alaska to the Santa Cruz Mountains near San Francisco and is known as the Pacific Forest. This forest has the most prodigious growth of conifers unequalled anywhere on earth. A combination of temperature, rainfall, and topography creates conditions favorable for growing the largest living organisms - the inland sequoias and the coast redwoods .

The Olympic rainforest of Washington supports dense stands of western hemlock, western red cedar, Sitka spruce, and Pacific silver and grand firs. Douglas fir is concentrated in Washington and Oregon. Alaska's predominate species is the western hemlock and Sitka spruce.

The Rocky Mountain Coniferous Forest Region

This Rocky Mountain forest region is more sparsely covered with trees. The most important trees here are ponderosa pine, western white pine, Douglas fir, lodgepole pine, and Engelmann's spruce. The use of fire in this region made it possible for big stands of lodgepole pine to take hold.

In the sub-alpine zone of the mountains spruce and fir predominate, and they are succeeded near the timber line by larch, whitebark pine, limber pine and bristlecone pine. The bristlecone pine has been discovered to be the oldest living thing.

The Northern Coniferous Forest Region
This Northern forest region spreads across four thousand miles, from Alaska to Newfoundland and down the higher peaks of the Appalachian mountains. In the north woods, white and black spruce grow. The soil throughout the Northern Forest is generally poor.

The most visible tree type in the region are conifers. The most prevalent conifers are balsam fir, eastern hemlock, northern white cedar, and eastern white pine . This northern region supplied much of the lumber used in the first 250 years of settlement in the United States.

The Central Coniferous Forest Region

The Central forest region touches 30 states from Cape Cod to the Rio Grande and back up to Canada. This forest is mostly deciduous which means that is green in the summer and bare in the winter. Although the main component is hardwood, there are several important softwoods. Eastern white pine and Virginia pine are common throughout the forest.

The Southern Coniferous Forest Region

The Southern forest occupies the coastal plains of the Atlantic from Virginia through the Gulf States and into Texas and Missouri. It is generally a forest created from abandoned old fields - many of which grew cotton.

See also
 Boreal forest of Canada

References

Forests of Canada
Forests of the United States